Ioannis Krestenitis (Greek: Ιωάννης Κρεστενίτης) was a Greek revolutionary leader during the Greek War of Independence.

He was responsible for economics during the revolution in the province of Pyrgos.  At the end, he retired from politics since he was old and moved himself in place with his brother Lykourgos Krestenitis.

References
The first version of the article is translated and is based from the article at the Greek Wikipedia (el:Main Page)

Greek people of the Greek War of Independence
People from Elis
19th-century Greek people
Year of birth unknown
Year of death unknown